Events from the year 1685 in France

Incumbents
 Monarch – Louis XIV

Events
22 October – Louis XIV issues the Edict of Fontainebleau, which revokes the Edict of Nantes and declares Protestantism illegal, thereby depriving Huguenots of civil rights. Their  is immediately demolished.
The decree Code Noir, passed by King Louis XIV, defines the conditions of slavery in the French colonial empire.
French colonization of Texas.

Births
 
6 January – Martin Bouquet, Benedictine and historian (died 1754)

Full date missing
Germain Louis Chauvelin, politician (died 1762)
Marie Adélaïde of Savoy, princess (died 1712)
Madeleine Leroy, industrialist (died 1749)

Deaths
9 February – Pierre Bourdelot, physician, anatomist, freethinker, abbé and libertine (born 1610)
25 March – Nicolas Robert, miniaturist and engraver (born 1614)
30 October – Michel Le Tellier, statesman (born 1603)
5 November – Jean de Montpezat de Carbon, bishop (born 1605)
28 November – Nicolas de Neufville de Villeroy, nobleman (born 1598)
25 December – Jacob Spon, archaeologist (born 1647)

See also

References

1680s in France